Power, Sex, Suicide: Mitochondria and the Meaning of Life is a 2005 popular science book by Nick Lane of University College London, which argues that mitochondria are central to questions of the evolution of multicellularity, the evolution of sexual reproduction, and to the process of senescence.

Amongst the theories advanced in the book, Lane endorses the hydrogen hypothesis for the formation of the eukaryotic cell, whereby mitochondria are the original defining characteristic of the structure. He argues that the event was an exceedingly improbable one and questions the likelihood of it having happened elsewhere in the Universe. He also suggests that the necessity for genetic compatibility between mitochondrial and nuclear DNA lies behind the differentiation of sex, ensuring that only one sexual partner contributes mitochondrial DNA to offspring.

Steven Rose in The Guardian said that the book contains "one of the most interesting stories modern biology has to tell". It was shortlisted for the Royal Society  Science Book Prize in 2006.

References

2005 non-fiction books
Popular science books
Books about evolution
Books about meaning of life